The 12th Politburo, formally the 12th Political Bureau of the Central Committee of the Communist Party of Vietnam (CPV, Vietnamese: Bộ Chính trị Ban Chấp hành trung ương Đảng Cộng sản Việt Nam Khoá XII), was elected at the 1st Plenary Session of the 12th Central Committee (CC) on 27 January 2016 during the 12th National Congress. Based on the principle that "the Party leads and the State manages", the Politburo is in between convocations of the Party's National Congress and the Central Committee's plenary sessions, the highest decision-making institution in the CPV and Vietnam. The Politburo is not a permanent institution and convenes meetings several times a month to discuss and decide upon significant policies. The total number of meetings the 12th Politburo convened has not been publicly disclosed to the media. Still, some have been publicly reported and are listed below (see "Meetings" section).

The 12th National Congress adopted a resolution that stated the CPV needed to establish a streamlined and efficient political system, and resolutely combat corruption, waste, and bureaucracy. Shortly after re-election to the Politburo, the General Secretary of the Central Committee, Nguyễn Phú Trọng, ramped up his anti-corruption campaign. Đinh La Thăng was removed from the Politburo in May 2017 by the 12th CC's 5th Plenary Session when the 12th Central Inspection Commission started investigating him for mismanaging the state-owned enterprise PetroVietnam, resulting in a loss of 800 billion Vietnamese dongs; he was arrested in December 2017 and sentenced to thirteen years in prison in January 2018. In tandem with the anti-corruption drive, Prime Minister Nguyễn Xuân Phúc began to streamline the government by cutting the number of deputy prime ministers from five to four and ministries from 26 to 22. Institutionally, the campaign was strengthened by appointing six members of the 12th Politburo to serve in the Central Steering Committee on Anti-corruption, providing the Central Inspection Commission with the ability to audit and supervise personnel property declarations under the Politburo and Secretariat's management, and seven central inspection teams were established to investigate serious corruption cases that drew public attention. This campaign developed in tandem with a campaign to strengthen party morality and Marxist–Leninist ideology and to combat perceived ideological evils such as liberal democratic values, self-evolution and self-transformation. 

Unlike in the 11th Politburo when Nguyễn Phú Trọng was involved in a power struggle against Nguyễn Tấn Dũng, then Prime Minister, the 12th Politburo was hallmarked by his dominance over decision-making. Considering his age (above the age limit of 65) and the CPV's Charter that limits general secretaries to serve a maximum of five-year terms, commentators such as Hai Hong Nguyen believed Nguyễn Phú Trọng would leave the office at the 13th National Congress in 2021. The Politburo approved regulation 90-QĐ/TW on 4 August 2017 to further institutionalise the transfer of power. To be appointed General Secretary, one needs to be an incumbent member of the Politburo who has served at least one full electoral term, the regulation states. Furthermore, it tasks the sitting CPV General Secretary to prepare their successor for office. Of the 17 members of the 12th Politburo, only Trọng and Đinh Thế Huynh did not meet the criteria to be elected General Secretary by the 13th Central Committee. However, the 13th National Congress granted Nguyễn Phú Trọng an exception from the age and term limit, thereby allowing him to serve a third term, leading political scientist Hung Nguyen to conclude: "The fact that Trọng was given special consideration twice — in 2016 for age exception and in 2021 for term limit — proves that he is the most powerful person in the country and, at the present time, irreplaceable."

The number of Politburo members increased from 16 during the 11th term to 19. Of these, three members were women (Nguyễn Thị Kim Ngân, Tòng Thị Phóng and Trương Thị Mai), the highest proportion of women serving in a given Politburo term in the CPV's history. Of the 19 members, 15 were members of the 14th National Assembly of Vietnam. A record-setting four members served as government ministers. Moreover, according to scholar Nguyen Manh Hung, "More important is the dominance by people with a public security background in the new 
leadership, perhaps in response to the need for political stability as well as the need to manage human rights issues when dealing with Western countries." Additionally, several Politburo members experienced health problems during their term. Đinh Thế Huynh was on sick leave from June 2017 and was relieved of his formal duties in March 2018. Trần Đại Quang, the President of Vietnam, having started to experience health issues in June 2017, passed away on 21 September 2018 at the age of 61. Thirteen days later, on 30 September, the Politburo voted to nominate Nguyễn Phú Trọng for state president. Shortly after his election to the presidency, rumours started to surface that Nguyễn Phú Trọng was also suffering from health problems, and on 14 April 2019, never officially confirmed, he purportedly suffered a stroke when visiting Kiên Giang province. However, Nguyễn Phú Trọng recovered, and in 2020, under his leadership, the 12th term disciplined Politburo members Nguyễn Văn Bình and Hoàng Trung Hải for defaming the party. The two retained their Politburo membership but could not seek reelection at the 13th National Congress. Of the remaining fourteen members who had not been arrested, died, disciplined or taken health leave, eighth were reelected to the 13th Politburo (Nguyễn Phú Trọng, Tô Lâm, Nguyễn Xuân Phúc, Phạm Minh Chính, Vương Đình Huệ, Phạm Bình Minh, Trương Thị Mai and Võ Văn Thưởng).

Meetings

Documents

Members

References

Bibliography
 
 
 
 
 

12th Politburo of the Communist Party of Vietnam